LGA 115x may refer to:

 LGA 1156 (Socket H)
 LGA 1155 (Socket H2)
 LGA 1150 (Socket H3)
 LGA 1151 (Socket H4)